Khrystyna Ruslanivna Dzhanhobekova (born 6 March 1992) is a Ukrainian badminton player.

Achievements

BWF International Challenge/Series 
Women's singles

Women's doubles

  BWF International Challenge tournament
  BWF International Series tournament
  BWF Future Series tournament

References

External links 
 

1992 births
Living people
Ukrainian female badminton players